Tatumn Marie Milazzo (born April 17, 1998) is an American professional soccer player who plays as a defender for National Women's Soccer League club Chicago Red Stars.

Career
Born in Orland Park, Illinois, Milazzo began her career with Chicago Eclipse Select before enrolling at the University of South Carolina and playing college soccer for the South Carolina Gamecocks. During her time with the Gamecocks from 2016 through 2019, Milazzo played 80 matches, scoring 3 goals. She also was part of the Gamecocks side that won three Southeastern Conference titles, in 2016, 2017, and 2019. In 2017, she helped the Gamecocks qualify for their first Women's College Cup appearance, where they were defeated by Stanford Cardinal in the semi-finals.

Chicago Red Stars
On February 1, 2021, Milazzo was announced as part of the pre-season squad for National Women's Soccer League club Chicago Red Stars. On April 5, 2021, Milazzo joined the Chicago Red Stars as a supplemental roster player. She made her professional debut for the club on April 9, 2021, against the Houston Dash in the NWSL Challenge Cup, coming on as an 87th-minute substitute as the Red Stars drew 0–0.

Career statistics

Honors
South Carolina Gamecocks
Southeastern Conference: 2016, 2017, 2019

NWSL
Second Best XI Recipient

References

External links
 Profile at National Women's Soccer League

1998 births
Living people
Sportspeople from the Chicago metropolitan area
American women's soccer players
Women's association football defenders
South Carolina Gamecocks women's soccer players
Chicago Red Stars players
National Women's Soccer League players
Soccer players from Illinois
People from Orland Park, Illinois